The Audie Award for Narration by the Author or Authors is one of the Audie Awards presented annually by the Audio Publishers Association (APA). It awards excellence in audiobook narration for an audiobook narrated by the author released in a given year. Before 2002 the award was given as the Audie Award for Solo Narration by the Author or Authors. It has been awarded since 1998.

Winners and finalists

1990s

2000s

2010s

2020s

References

External links 

 Audie Award winners
 Audie Awards official website

Narration by the Author
English-language literary awards
Awards established in 1998